The Canadian independent music scene has been active for some decades, with significant growth occurring in the mid-1970s. The industry is largely split along the language divide, for example SOPROQ is a collective that focuses mainly on the French-speaking domestic sector and some international artists, whereas the Canadian Independent Record Production Association (CIRPA) is an industry association composed of English speaking labels, producers and others. Dorland argues that (as of 1996) "the racial and ethnic boundaries" are growing stronger.

History

1970s
Around this time many independent record labels distributed through London Records  including Maple Records, Smile Records, Attic Records, Boot Records, Kilmarnock Records, and French language labels including Socite Zoologique du Quebec.  Goldfish Records moved from London to A&M.

In 1975 CIRPA was formed to represent the English-speaking independent music industry.

1980s

X-records was an independent record label that recorded the Rheostatics first album and other bands like Pig Farm and Nomind.

Toronto, Ont
Adam Faux, Corrinne Timmins, Rob (last name unknown)

Dove Entertainment (Toronto) - released Industrial and experimental bands/ music

1990s

2000s
In 2006 the Independent Digital Licensing Agency (IDLA) was set up by CIPRA and twenty independents with funding form the Ontario government (Ontario Media Development Corporation).

2010s

Artist owned labels

List of labels

Currently Active
473 SOUND INC.
 473 SOUND (record label)
 604 Records
 Aardskarf Records
 Arbutus Records
 Ariella Records
 Arts & Crafts
 ALTR Inc
 Blue Fog Recordings
 Borealis Records
Buzz Masters War
 Constellation Records
 Cargo Records
Close to Modern
City Natives Ent.
City Natives Records
 Deadbeats
 Dare to Care Records
 Deep Therapy Records
 Dine Alone Records
 Distort Entertainment
Faith Bow Media Ltd
FAITH BOW MUSIC CO.
 Fileunder:music
 Flemish Eye
 FOF Records Inc.
Funktasy Records
 Hype-R Music Group
 Justin Time Records
 Last Gang Records
 Leaf Music
 Light Organ Records
 Linus Entertainment
FOF Records Inc. 
 Mint Records
 Monstercat
 Nettwerk Productions
 Omerta Records
 Royalty Records
 Paper Bag Records
 Preeminent Music Group
 Secret City Records
 Six Shooter Records
 Sonic Unyon
 Stand One Records
 True North Records
 Tiger Music Productions Canada
 UNT Records
 Gladiator Records
 ViiiZUALEYES Media Group & Recordings Inc

Currently Defunct
 Blocks Recording Club
 Mammoth Cave Recording Co.
 Orange Records
 Three Gut Records
TheBrokenReckords Entertainment
Broken Reckords Media Group

See also
 :Category:Canadian independent record labels
 Canadian Independent Record Production Association

References